Niko Nieminen (born 1982) is a Finnish professional ice hockey forward who currently plays for HPK of the SM-liiga.

References

External links

Living people
Espoo Blues players
HPK players
Finnish ice hockey forwards
1982 births